Lavieille is a surname. Notable people with the surname include:

Adrien Lavieille (1848–1920), French painter
Andrée Lavieille (1887–1960), French painter
Christian Lavieille (born 1965), French racing driver
Eugène Lavieille (1820–1889), French painter
Marie Adrien Lavieille (1852–1911), French painter
Marie Ernestine Lavieille (1852–1937), French painter